Nicholas Oliver Lawson (born Nicolai Olaus Lossius; 23 November 1790 – 1 March 1851) was a Norwegian-born, vice governor of Galápagos for the Republic of Ecuador. While there, he provided information  which contributed to Charles Darwin's first realisation that species might be changeable, and eventually to Darwin's theorising about evolution.

Life and interaction with Darwin
Nicolai Olaus Lossius  was born on the island of Sekken in Romsdal, Norway. He was baptized in Veøy Church outside Molde in Romsdal during late 1790. At 16, he went to sea where he sailed from England. As Nicholas Oliver Lawson, he took citizenship in the United States in 1811. He participated as a naval officer in the War of 1812 and later settled in Canada. By 1818, he had joined the Chilean Navy and fought in the Chilean War of Independence (1810–1821). In 1824, he married Rosario Asenjo (b. 1807) daughter of an officer in the Spanish Army. He  operated as a ship builder, owner and trader. He was deputy governor of the Galápagos Islands from approximately 1832 to 1837 and acting governor when Charles Darwin visited the islands in September 1835. By 1839, Lawson returned to his wife and children in Valparaíso, Chile where he died in 1851.

Darwin named Lawson several times in his notes and diaries. When the Beagle survey expedition arrived at Charles Island (Floreana Island) in September 1835, Darwin noted in his diary: "An Englishman Mr Lawson is now acting as Governor. — By chance he came down to visit a Whaling Vessel & in the morning accompanied us to the Settlement." Lawson described having seen a reduction in the numbers and size of Galápagos tortoises taken for meat by the whalers. In his zoological notes, Darwin recorded that "It is said that slight variations in the form of the shell are constant according to the Island which they inhabit — also the average largest size appears equally to vary according to the locality.— Mr Lawson states he can on seeing a Tortoise pronounce with certainty from which island it has been brought." This was one of the points which Darwin listed later in the voyage, between mid-June and August 1836, as arousing his first suspicion that "such facts would undermine the stability of Species". After the voyage, Darwin developed this idea during his investigations into transmutation of species, resulting in his theory of evolution.

References 

1790 births
1851 deaths
People from Molde
Norwegian sailors
United States Navy personnel of the War of 1812
People of the Chilean War of Independence
Norwegian expatriates in Chile
Governors of Galápagos Province
Norwegian emigrants to the United States
United States Navy officers